The simple station Centro Comercial Paseo Villa del Río - Madelena is part of the TransMilenio mass-transit system of Bogotá, Colombia, opened in the year 2000.

Location 

The station is located in southern Bogotá, specifically on Autopista Sur with Carrera 64B.

It serves the Olarte and Villa del Río neighborhoods, as well as the Makro store on Autopista Sur.

History 

This station was opened April 15, 2006 as part of the section between the stations General Santander and Portal del Sur of the NQS line.

The station is named Centro Comercial Paseo Villa del Río - Madelena due to its proximity to the area of the same name.

Station Services

Old trunk services

Main line service 

Complementary services

The following complementary route also works:

  to the Centro Comercial Paseo Villa del Río - Madelena neighborhood. (Temporarily suspended)

Inter-city service 

This station does not have inter-city service.

External links 
 TransMilenio

See also 
 Bogotá
 TransMilenio
 List of TransMilenio stations

TransMilenio
Railway stations in Colombia